Universidad José María Vargas is a university in Caracas, based in the Sucre Municipality.

Universities and colleges in Caracas